Flowers is an English surname. Notable people with the surname include:

A. D. Flowers (1917–2001), American visual effects artist
Adam Flowers, American singer
Adrian Flowers (1926–2016), British photographer
Alfred K. Flowers (born 1947), United States Air Force officer
Ben Flowers (1927–2009), American baseball player
Bernie Flowers (1930–2011), American footballer
Bess Flowers (1898–1984), American actress
Betty Sue Flowers, American academic and writer
Bill Flowers (born 1963), Australian artist
Bob Flowers (1917–1962), American footballer
Brandon Flowers (born 1981), American singer and musician
Brandon Flowers (American football) (born 1986), American football player 
Brian Flowers, Baron Flowers (1924–2010), British physicist
Bruce Flowers (born 1957), American basketball player
Buck Flowers (1899–1983), American footballer
Charlie Flowers (1937–2014), American football player
Chipman L. Flowers, Jr. (born 1974), American politician
Christine Flowers (born 1960), American singer and actor
Curtis Flowers (born 1970), American murderer
Dallis Flowers (born 1997), American football player
Dick Flowers (1927–2010), American football player
Dickie Flowers (1850–1892), American baseball player
Dimitri Flowers (born 1996), American football player
Danny Flowers (born 1948), American musician
Don Flowers (1908–1968), American cartoonist
Edwin F. Flowers (1930=2022), American lawyer, judge, and civil servant
Ereck Flowers (born 1994), American football player
Erik Flowers (born 1978), American football player
Frank E. Flowers (born 1979), Caymanian filmmaker
Frederick Flowers (1810–1886), English police magistrate
Gennifer Flowers (born 1950), American model and actress
George Flowers (politician) (1879–1958), Australian politician
George Flowers (footballer) (1907–1991), English footballer
George French Flowers (1811–1872), English composer
Grandmaster Flowers (died 1992), American disc jockey
H.H. Flowers (born 1865), American politician
Herbie Flowers (born 1938), English musician
J. Christopher Flowers (born 1957), American investor
Jacob Flowers, 19th century American settler
Jackie Flowers (born 1958), American football player
Jake Flowers (1902–1962), American baseball player
Jason Flowers (born 1975), British rugby player and coach
Jewel Flowers (1923–2006), American model 
John Flowers (disambiguation), multiple people
Keith Flowers (1930–1993), American football player
Kenny Flowers (born 1964), American football player
Kim Flowers, American actress 
Lannie Flowers, American musician
Larry Flowers (disambiguation), multiple people
Lethon Flowers (born 1973), American football player
Marquis Flowers (born 1992), American football player
Mary E. Flowers (born 1951), American politician
Michael Flowers (disambiguation), multiple people
Ness Flowers, Welsh rugby player
Nina Flowers (born 1974), Puerto Rican drag queen, disc jockey and make-up artist
Pat Flowers (1917–2000), American jazzer
Paul Flowers (banker) (born 1950), English politician, minister and banker
Paul Flowers (footballer) (born 1974), English footballer
Percy Flowers (1903–1982), American farmer and alcohol producer
Quinton Flowers (born 1994), American football player
R. Barri Flowers, American author
Ramona Flowers
Richmond Flowers (disambiguation), multiple people
Robert B. Flowers, United States Army officer
Robert Lee Flowers (1870–1951), American university administrator
Ron Flowers (1934–2021), English footballer 
Ron Flowers (American football), American football coach
Rudolph Flowers (born 1980), Belize footballer
Ruth Flowers (born 1940), British disc jockey
Sibby Flowers (born 1963), American weightlifter
Stephanie Flowers (born c. 1953), American politician
Stephen Flowers (born 1953), American writer
Tairia Flowers (born 1981), American softballer
Thomas Flowers (disambiguation), multiple people
Thomas Harold Flowers (1905–1998), British engineer
Tiger Flowers (1895–1927), American boxer
Tim Flowers (born 1967), English goalkeeper
Tommy Flowers (1905–1998), British engineer and computer designer
Tre Flowers (born 1995), American football player
Tyler Flowers (born 1986), American baseball player
Vic Flowers, English cricket supporter
Vivian Flowers (born c. 1969), American politician 
Vonetta Flowers (born 1973), American bobsledder
Walter Flowers (1933–1984), American politician 
Wayland Flowers (1939–1988), American puppeteer
Wes Flowers (1913–1988), American baseball player
Wilfred Flowers (1856–1926), English cricketer
Woodie Flowers (1943-2019), American engineer
Zay Flowers (born 2000), American football player

See also
 [90+] Flowers Name In Hindi And English
 Fleur (given name)
 Flora (disambiguation)
 Flora (surname)
 Flower (name)
 Tzitzak, Khazar princess and Byzantine Empress whose name meant "flower"

English-language surnames